The Rowley P-40F was an American homebuilt aircraft that was designed by Richard J Rowley and marketed by his company 76th Fighter Squadron Inc, of Meadow Lake Airport, Colorado, first flown in 1986. When it was available the aircraft was supplied in the form of plans for amateur construction.

The Rowley P-40F was a 3/4 scale replica of the Second World War Curtiss P-40 Warhawk.

The company, 76th Fighter Squadron Inc, was named for the 76th Fighter Squadron, formerly a Flying Tigers unit flying P-40s.

Design and development
The P-40F featured a cantilever low wing, a single-seat enclosed cockpit under a sliding canopy, conventional landing gear and a single engine in tractor configuration. The aircraft was capable of aerobatics.

The aircraft fuselage was made from welded 4130 steel tubing, covered in sheet 2024-T3 aluminum.

Operational history
On Sunday, 2 July 2000 in Peyton, Colorado the prototype and sole example, registered N42915, crashed, killing the designer/builder of the aircraft. The National Transportation Safety Board summarized the events: "The pilot was performing a low fly-by over runway 33, and as the airplane reached the departure end, the engine lost power. Witnesses said that the pilot made a left turn back towards runway 15. Subsequently the airplane hit wires, impacted terrain, cart wheeled, came to rest against a transmission pole, and burned. Post accident examination of the engine revealed that the gear reduction assembly had failed. The pilot had designed and built the airplane in 1986." The NTSB assigned cause factors: "the pilot's inadequate decision to turn back (low altitude) towards the runway for a forced landing. A contributing factor was the total loss of engine power due to a reduction gear failure."

The sole example's Federal Aviation Administration registration in the United States expired on 30 September 2013.

Specifications (P-40F)

See also
List of aerobatic aircraft

References

External links
Photo of the sole Rowley P-40F

P-40F
1980s United States sport aircraft
1980s United States ultralight aircraft
Single-engined tractor aircraft
Low-wing aircraft
Homebuilt aircraft
Aerobatic aircraft
Replica aircraft
Aircraft first flown in 1986